Daniel Joseph Ryan is an American politician to the Massachusetts House of Representatives. He is a Democrat from Boston, Massachusetts who was sworn on April 16, 2014 to represent the 2nd Suffolk seat. He won the March 4 primary and the April 1 special election called after the resignation of Eugene O'Flaherty.

See also
 2019–2020 Massachusetts legislature
 2021–2022 Massachusetts legislature

References

Democratic Party members of the Massachusetts House of Representatives
Living people
Politicians from Boston
21st-century American politicians
Year of birth missing (living people)